The 2012 NCAA Division II football season, part of college football in the United States organized by the National Collegiate Athletic Association at the Division II level, began on September 1, 2012, and concluded with the NCAA Division II Football Championship on December 15, 2012 at Braly Municipal Stadium in Florence, Alabama, hosted by the University of North Alabama. The Valdosta State Blazers defeated the Winston-Salem State Rams, 35–7, to win their third Division II national title.

It proved to be the final season for the West Virginia Intercollegiate Athletic Conference (WVIAC). Shortly before the start of the 2012–13 school year, the WVIAC's nine football-playing members announced plans to break away and form a new league. Before the new conference was announced, one of the nine breakaway schools (Seton Hill) chose instead to join the Pennsylvania State Athletic Conference; the remaining eight schools joined with three other football-playing schools and one non-football WVIAC member left out of the original split. The new league, officially unveiled in August 2012 as the Mountain East Conference, began play in 2013.

The Harlon Hill Trophy was awarded to Zach Zulli, quarterback from Shippensburg.

Conference changes and new programs
The Great Lakes Valley Conference began football play in 2012.

Minot State, Notre Dame (OH), Simon Fraser, Sioux Falls, and William Jewell completed their transitions to Division II and became eligible for the postseason.

Regional realignment
The GNAC, MIAA, and Great American moved from Super Region 4 to Super Region 3, while the RMAC and GLIAC moved in the opposite direction; the GLVC, newly sponsoring football, was assigned to Super Region 4.

Conference standings

Super Region 1

Super Region 2

Super Region 3

Super Region 4

Conference champions

Postseason

The 2012 NCAA Division II Football Championship playoffs were the 39th single-elimination tournament to determine the national champion of men's NCAA Division II college football. The championship game was held at Braly Municipal Stadium in Florence, Alabama for the 25th time.

Seeded teams
Ashland
Carson–Newman
CSU Pueblo
Henderson State
Minnesota State–Mankato
New Haven
Winston-Salem State
Valdosta State

Playoff bracket

* Home team    † Overtime

Awards and honors

Harlon Hill Trophy
The Harlon Hill Trophy is given to the year's most outstanding player.

See also
 2013 NCAA Division I FBS football season
 2013 NCAA Division I FCS football season
 2013 NCAA Division III football season
 2013 NAIA football season

References